Mangosuthu University of Technology (MUT) is a university of technology situated in Umlazi near the city of Durban, South Africa, on a site overlooking the Indian Ocean. MUT is located in the academic hub in the eThekwini metropole. It is a residential university.

History
The history of the university begins in 1974 with Prince Mangosuthu Buthelezi, former Prime Minister in KwaZulu Homeland in apartheid South Africa. At a meeting with the Chairman of the Anglo American Corporation and De Beers Consolidated Mines, Mr Harry F Oppenheimer, Prince Buthelezi first put forward the idea of establishing a tertiary education institution specialising in technical subjects. The proposal was taken up by the Anglo American and De Beers Chairman's Fund, and, although funds were not immediately available to construct such an institution, research was commissioned to investigate the potential in South Africa for the training and employment of black technicians.

This work was undertaken by the South African Labour and Development Research Unit (SALDRU) of the University of Cape Town, which analysed the enrolment of the then existing advanced technical education centres and calculated that the output of engineering technicians in 1976 was 1035, whereas there was a demand for 3000 additional technicians per annum. Thus if Black youths were to become available for training, an annual output of 2000 engineering technicians could be considered. SALDRU then ascertained the willingness of employers to employ Black technicians if they were to become available. The response indicated that the categories most in immediate demand were mechanical, civil and construction, electrical, and chemical engineering.

As the SALDRU study by Nigel Bloch showed that there was an immediate need and demand for Black technicians, Mr Oppenheimer undertook that The Anglo American and De Beers group Chairman's Fund would provide R5 million to build the necessary facilities. At a later stage, Mobil Oil, AECI and the South African Sugar Millers’ Association agreed to sponsor the Department of Chemical Engineering and the Rembrandt and Distillers Corporation groups provided the establishment of a Commercial and Secretarial Department. LTA Limited added funds for the expansion of the Civil Engineering Department so that Construction Engineering could be included in the curriculum.

In mid-1977 the go-ahead was given for the project to begin and it was decided by the KwaZulu Cabinet that the institution would be named ‘Mangosuthu’, the first name of KwaZulu's Chief Minister, Prince Buthelezi, the man who conceived the idea of a technikon in KwaZulu. An eminently suitable site for the technikon was found in Umlazi which, while part of KwaZulu, is also part of the Durban metropolitan area. Umlazi Township is a township developed in 1967 for Black people during the apartheid era. It is located south-west of Durban and it is one of the largest townships in South Africa. The township is about 30 kilometers from the Durban city centre. At the time it was a large and rapidly growing area of some 370 000 people which is close to and easily accessible from the major industrial area as well as the city centre of Durban and the then Louis Botha Airport, later to become Durban International Airport (which has now been relocated to the North Coast and renamed King Shaka International Airport).

See also
Rankings of universities in South Africa
 Rankings of business schools in South Africa

References

Universities in KwaZulu-Natal
Public universities in South Africa